The Wellspring Theater is a theater in Zhongzheng District, Taipei, Taiwan.

History

The Shui Yuan Building was once the unit of the Republic of China Armed Forces handling compulsory military service. In 2009, the building was rebuilt and reopened in November 2011.

Architecture

Wellspring Theater is located on the 10th floor of the Shui Yuan Building.

Transportation
The theater is accessible within walking distance South East from Gongguan Station of the Taipei Metro.

See also
 Cinema of Taiwan

References

2011 establishments in Taiwan
Buildings and structures in Taipei
Tourist attractions in Taipei
Theatres completed in 2011
Theatres in Taiwan